Don Anding (born May 31, 1991 in Amity Harbor, New York) is an American professional soccer player who plays as a defender.

Career

Philadelphia Union
On January 17, 2013 Anding was selected as the 26th overall pick in the 2013 MLS SuperDraft by the Philadelphia Union and on March 1, 2013 it was announced that Anding had officially signed with the Major League Soccer team.

Harrisburg City Islanders (loan)
Then in April 2013 it was revealed that Anding was loaned out to the Harrisburg City Islanders for the 2013 USL Pro season. Anding then made his debut for the Islanders on April 13, 2013 against the Pittsburgh Riverhounds in which he started and played the whole 90 minutes as the Islanders won the match 2–1.

Career statistics

Club

Updated July 6, 2013

References

1991 births
Living people
American soccer players
Association football forwards
Major League Soccer players
Northeastern Huskies men's soccer players
Philadelphia Union draft picks
Philadelphia Union players
Penn FC players
People from Amityville, New York
Soccer players from New York (state)
Sportspeople from Suffolk County, New York
USL Championship players